The 1996 Snooker World Cup was a team snooker tournament which returned after a six-year absence. With the increasing rise of snooker in some countries, This new version has 20 teams in the championship and it was played in Bangkok in Thailand. Scotland's  'Dream Team' with Stephen Hendry, Alan McManus and John Higgins were strong favourites to win from the start and they did so by beating Republic of Ireland with Ken Doherty, Fergal O'Brien and Stephen Murphy to win their only World Cup. Higgins got the highest break of the tournament with a 139 in his semi-final match against Thailand's Tai Pichit. The tournament was a success but hosting the event had become too costly that the event was withdrawn afterward.



Main draw

Teams

Darren Morgan was later replaced by Mark Bennett after the death of his mother.

The two best teams from each group advanced to the quarter-finals.

Group A

Group B

Group C

Group D

Final

References

World Cup (snooker)
1996 in snooker
1996 in Thai sport